Jasmina Tinjić (born 27 February 1991) is former professional Bosnian tennis player.

Tinjić has won four singles and twelve doubles titles on the ITF Circuit. On 23 September 2013, she reached her best singles ranking of world No. 236. On 29 Mai 2017, she also peaked at No. 236 in the doubles rankings.

Playing for the Bosnia and Herzegovina Fed Cup team, Tinjić has a win–loss record of 14–9.

ITF finals

Singles (4–6)

Doubles (12–8)

References

External links
 
 
 

1991 births
Living people
Bosnia and Herzegovina female tennis players